Guy Babylon (December 20, 1956 – September 2, 2009) was an American keyboardist/composer, most noted for his work with Elton John.   

Babylon was born in New Windsor, Maryland.  He attended Francis Scott Key High School before moving on to the University of South Florida, on a swimming scholarship, where he earned a BFA in music composition in 1979. Upon graduation, he moved to Los Angeles, California. In 1988, he joined Elton John's studio and touring band, appearing on the album Sleeping with the Past. In 1990, he performed with the group Warpipes, a side project of fellow Elton John member Davey Johnstone. Guy performed and recorded with several artists such as Mike Pinera, Iron Butterfly, Blues Image, Luis Cardenas and Renegade.

Guy Babylon also arranged many Elton John introductions, including those used in "Bennie and the Jets" and "Pinball Wizard".  In 2001, Babylon won a Grammy Award for his contributions on the Elton John / Tim Rice musical Aida. Babylon also worked extensively on the Elton John / Bernie Taupin musical Lestat, (based on the Anne Rice novels). Until his death, he lived in Los Angeles with his wife and children, and was a member of Elton John's six-member touring and recording band. He died of a heart attack on September 2, 2009, after swimming in a pool.

References

External links
 Obituary in the Los Angeles Times, Sept. 19, 2009
 Guy's page on Vimeo (includes one video, "Las Vegas Twister", which he produced and uploaded in 2009 shortly before his death)

1956 births
2009 deaths
21st-century American keyboardists
People from New Windsor, Maryland
University of South Florida alumni
Iron Butterfly members
Elton John Band members
Grammy Award winners
American rock keyboardists
American session musicians
20th-century American keyboardists